The history of Bridgeport, Connecticut was, in the late 17th and most of the 18th century, one of land acquisitions from the native inhabitants, farming and fishing. From the mid-18th century to the mid-19th century, Bridgeport's history was one of shipbuilding, whaling and rapid growth. Bridgeport's growth accelerated even further from the mid-19th century to the mid-20th century with the advent of the railroad, Industrialization, massive immigration, labor movements until, at its peak population in 1950, Bridgeport with some 159,000 people was Connecticut's second most populous city. In the late 20th century, Bridgeport's history was one of deindustrialization and declining population, though it overtook Hartford as the state's most populous city by 1980.

Early years
Much of the land that became Bridgeport was originally occupied by the Pequonnock Indians of the Paugussett nation. One village consisted of about five or six hundred inhabitants in approximately 150 lodgings.

Other than Black Rock and Parts of Brooklawn which were originally part of the township of Fairfield, Bridgeport was originally a part of the township of Stratford. The first English settlement on the west bank of the mouth of the Pequonnock River was made in about 1665 and was called Pequonnock. (Some sources have the first settlement as early as 1639 or 1659.) This village was renamed Newfield sometime before 1777. More people settled further inland and to the West and the area collectively became known as Fairfield Village in 1694, a name that was officially changed to Stratfield in 1701, likely due to its location between the already existing towns of Stratford and Fairfield. The ecclesiastical history of Bridgeport begins with the formation of the Stratfield Ecclesiastical Society in 1678 for the purpose of forming a school, with reference to a pastor ministering in Stratfield as early as 1688; and the establishment of a Congregational Church in 1695.
  
During the American Revolution, Bridgeport was a center of privateering. Captain David Hawley of Stratfield brought a number of prizes into Black Rock Harbor. In 1800, Newfield village on the west bank of the Pequonnock was chartered as the borough of Bridgeport, and, in 1821, the township of Bridgeport, including more of Stratfield, was incorporated. Finally, Bridgeport was chartered as a city in 1836.

Bridgeport's early years were marked by a reliance on fishing and farming, much like other towns in New England. The city's location on the deep Newfield harbor (mouth of the Pequonnock) fostered a boom in shipbuilding and whaling in the mid-19th century. To aid navigation, Bridgeport Harbor Light was constructed in 1851 and reconstructed in 1871. Bridgeport's growth accelerated after the opening of a railroad to the city in 1840. Bridgeport was connected by rail first to New Milford in 1840, then Waterbury and New Haven in 1848, and New York City in 1849.

In the 1820s, about the time Connecticut abolished slavery, free blacks started settling in a neighborhood that became known as "Little Liberia", whose oldest surviving buildings date to 1848 and are Connecticut's oldest African-American houses.

In the 1830s, East Bridgeport was still largely farmland but the construction of foot and general traffic bridges over the Pequonnock in the 1840s and 1850s opened the area to development and it was not long before the area became a major area for industry.

Bridgeport annexed Black Rock and its busy harbor in 1870. The annexation added Black Rock Harbor Light to the city's navigation aids and, in 1874, Penfield Reef Light was soon added on the south side of Black Rock harbor. Bridgeport harbor remained active and Tongue Point Light was constructed in 1895 to mark its west boundary.

In the late 19th century, Bridgeport became the county seat of Fairfield County. County government was abolished in Connecticut in 1960, but the Fairfield County Courthouse built in 1888 still stands as testimony to that time in Bridgeport's history.

In 1902, rail traffic was simplified with the addition of the Pequonnock River Railroad Bridge. Trolley service also came to Bridgeport and, in 1910, a major repair and storage facility, the Connecticut Railway and Lighting Company Car Barn, was constructed in downtown Bridgeport.

Abraham Lincoln's visit

In February 1860, Abraham Lincoln came east to speak at Cooper Union in New York City, where on February 27 he impressed eastern Republicans as an intelligent, dignified statesman and gained support in his bid for the presidential nomination. Since the speech went over well, he made several others (all similar to his Cooper Union speech) in Connecticut and Rhode Island, traveling by train to various cities. After stopping in Providence, Norwich, Hartford, Meriden and New Haven, he made his final speech in the evening of Saturday, March 10, in Bridgeport.

His train was scheduled to stop at 10:27 a.m. in Bridgeport, and he likely met with Republican leaders. "He was entertained at the home of Mr. Frederick Wood at 67 Washington Avenue, and it is said that there he had his first experience with New England fried oysters," wrote Nelson R. Burr in Abraham Lincoln: Western Star Over Connecticut. "Another tradition is that while he stayed in Bridgeport a little girl, Mary A. Curtis of Stratford, presented him with a bouquet of flowers and a bunch of salt hay from the Stratford meadows. ... Where the flowers came from at that season, and how the hay could be cheerfully green, is not explained."

Lincoln spoke in Washington Hall, an auditorium at what was then Bridgeport City Hall (now McLevy Hall), at the corner of State and Broad streets. Not only was the largest room in the city packed, but a crowd formed outside made up of people who could not get in. He received a standing ovation before taking the 9:07 p.m. train that night back to Manhattan. A plaque now stands at the site in Bridgeport where he gave the speech.

Other notables who gave speeches in Bridgeport include Martin Luther King Jr., who spoke three times at the Klein Auditorium in 1961, 1964 and 1966 and at Central High School in 1962; and President George W. Bush who spoke before a small, selected group of Connecticut business people and officials about health care reform at the Playhouse on the Green, just across the street from McLevy Hall, in 2006.

Barnum
The city's most famous resident has been circus-promoter and once-mayor P.T. Barnum, who built four houses in the city (Iranistan and Waldemere were the most renowned) and housed his circus in-town during winters. The Barnum Museum, housed in a building that was originally contracted for construction by P. T. Barnum himself, has an extensive collection related to P. T. Barnum and the history of Bridgeport. In 1949, Bridgeport initiated a Barnum Day parade which has grown into an annual multi-day festival. Barnum, as well as many other notables, is buried in  Mountain Grove Cemetery, Bridgeport, in the park-like setting he designed.

The Park City
The  of Washington Park in East Bridgeport were first set aside as a park in 1851 by William H. Noble and P. T. Barnum, with the land being deeded to the city in 1865. As the city rapidly grew in population, residents recognized the need for more public parks. In 1863, The Standard urged the creation of one or more public parks in the city and a movement to create a park along Long Island Sound and Black Rock Harbor began. In 1881, the city contracted Frederick Law Olmsted, famous for creating New York City's Central Park, to create a design for Beardsley Park. Olmsted described the existing land as "pastoral, sylvan and idyllic" and, in 1884, delivered his plan for a simple, rural park for the residents to enjoy: "[The land donated by Beardsley] is thoroughly rural and just such a countryside as a family of good taste and healthy nature would resort to, if seeking a few hours' complete relief from scenes associated with the wear and tear of ordinary town life.... It is a better picnic ground than any possessed by the city of New York, after spending twenty million on parks.... The object of any public outlay upon it should be to develop and bring out these distinctive local advantages, and make them available to extensive use in the future by large numbers of people." Bridgeport's parks were not all just for picnics and promenades. Newfield Park was the home of a minor league baseball team, the Bridgeport Orators who won their league's championship in 1904. Over time, more parks and attractions were added including  Beechwood Park, a zoo established in a portion of Beardsley Park and Pleasure Beach, home to a popular amusement park for many years.

City growth
The city rapidly industrialized in the late-19th century, and became a manufacturing center producing such goods as the famous Bridgeport milling machine, brass fittings, carriages, sewing machines, saddles, and ammunition. Some employers took steps beyond paying wages for the benefit of their employees, such as the Warner Brothers Corset Company which built the Seaside Institute as a social and educational facility for its women workers.

The New York sporting goods firm of Schuyler, Hartley & Graham selected Bridgeport for the site of their Union Metallic Cartridge Company ammunition factory in 1867. The factory became headquarters of Remington UMC in 1912. With the start of World War I in Europe in 1914, Bridgeport became a new world arsenal some called "the Essen of America" and Bridgeport's population exploded, growing by nearly 50 percent in a 20-month period. After receiving an order from the Russian Empire in 1915 for one million rifles with 400,000,000 cartridges, Remington UMC built a factory complex of thirteen buildings with 80 acres of floor space; and hired 1,500 new workers per month until 17,000 were engaged in arms production. The Russian order was nearing completion when the Russian Revolution deposed Czar Nicholas II and refused to pay for the rifles and ammunition. The factory complex exceeded the needs of Remington UMC after Armistice Day, and was used by General Electric after 1920.

Rapidly growing industry led to labor unrest. As a city planning consultant put it, "Wages have risen, but so have rents, the price of real estate and the cost of living," going on to give an example a worker earning the prevailing wage whose family had been turned out on the street when unable to meet a 25 percent increase in rent. In the summer of 1915, a series of strikes demanding the eight-hour day began in Bridgeport. They were so successful that they spread throughout the Northeast. While thousands took part in the Bridgeport strikes of 1915, few were actually union members and many were women who had been denied membership in craft unions. For instance, the Bryant Electric Company strike  was started by five hundred women assemblers and a handful of men who walked off the job. The other workers joined the strike and after two weeks the company acceded to the workers' demands for an eight-hour day, overtime pay and union representation. Similar strikes with similar results played out at factories throughout the city and in the course of a few months, Bridgeport was transformed into an eight-hour day city. Bridgeport came out of World War I and its wartime strikes with a radicalized labor force which, in combination with the labor troubles of the Great Depression, ultimately led to socialist Jasper McLevy occupying city hall from 1933 to 1957.

Bridgeport's industrial growth was fueled by, and attracted, immigration from overseas. By 1920, 32.4 percent of the population was foreign born with another 40.4 percent being the children of immigrants. As for the labor force, 73 percent were foreign born. The immigrant neighborhoods were located mostly south of the railroad line, near the factories and to the shore and included Eastern and Southern Europeans, Scandinavians and Irish. At this point, African Americans constituted 1.6 percent of Bridgeport's population. In later years, much of Bridgeport's labor force would come from other parts of the country and the Americas. By 1990, the African American percentage of the population had increased to 26.6 percent and residents of Hispanic origin constituted 26.5 percent of Bridgeport's population. 

By 1930 Bridgeport was a thriving industrial center with more than 500 factories and a booming immigrant population. World War II provided a further boost to the city's industries. Famous factories included Wheeler & Wilson, which produced sewing machines and exported them throughout the world, Remington UMC, Bridgeport Brass, General Electric Company, American Graphophone Company (Columbia Records), Warner Brothers Corset Company (Warnaco) and the Locomobile Company of America, builder of one of the premier automobiles in the early years of the century. The city was home to the Frisbie Pie Company from 1871 to 1958, and therefore it has been argued that Bridgeport is the birthplace of the frisbee. In another "first", Bridgeport had the first dental hygiene school in the country, opened in 1913 by Dr. Alfred Fones with a first class of 34 women.

A growing city needed more housing and developers provided it, such as the Irish working-class neighborhood of Sterling Hill, the 1880s rental units now preserved as the Bassickville Historic District and the World War I emergency housing for workers that now constitutes the Black Rock Gardens Historic District. A rapidly expanding Bridgeport also needed more and modern schools, such as Maplewood School, built in 1893 and expanded several times thereafter, Central High School built in 1876 as Bridgeport High School, Warren Harding High School (1924) and Bassick High School (1929). The new immigrants wanted their own houses of worship, too, such as the Polish community's St. Michael's built in the East Side in 1907 and the Hungarian Jewish communities Achavath Achim Synagogue built in the West End in 1926.

Bridgeport saw commercial development too, such as the formation of several banks and commercial establishments like D. M. Read's department store in its thriving downtown. In 1933, Lawrence Hoyt, who later went on to found Waldenbooks got his start in the book business when he opened up a small book rental business in a corner of Read's. The city is also home to the first Subway Restaurant, opened in 1965, at 5 corners on North Main Street and Jewett, Tesiny and Beechmont Avenues.

Deindustrialization
Like other urban centers in Connecticut, Bridgeport fared less well during the deindustrialization of the United States in the 1970s and 1980s. Suburban flight as well as overall mismanagement, for which several city officials were convicted, contributed to the decline.

From the mid-1960s through the early 1990s, Bridgeport was one of the most dangerous cities in Connecticut. As with many urban New England cities, such as New Haven and Hartford, the city had a high crime and murder rate. In following years, Bridgeport soon became ravaged by urban blight. A large white flight occurred in the city, as it started to become a much more dangerous place to work and live. Soon, the population of the city declined as many companies began laying off their employees, thus dropping city employment rate. The total population dropped from 158,709 in 1950 to 141,686 in 1990. The city also operated many public housing projects, some of which still stand today and some of which were known nationwide due to their high crime and deplorable conditions. Such projects were Beardsley Terrace/Trumbull Gardens Apartments in the city's North End, P.T. Barnum Apartments on the West Side, Pequonnock Apartments and Marina Village in the South End, the Green Apartments in the Hollow, and the most infamous: Father Panik Village. Father Panik opened in 1939 as the first of its kind in New England, and the sixth largest public housing project in the county, located in the Lower East Side. It would later be known as one of the worst housing projects in the United States. In 1982, Bridgeport Housing Authority's projects were deemed deplorable by federal officials and eventually placed the Housing Authority on the country's "troubled list". However, by 1988, the infamous Father Panik Village was torn down. Today, only a vacant lot several blocks in size, remains. The city also experienced problems with arson during this time, leading to whole neighborhoods burning down, at the same time as cuts and company closures occurred to the Bridgeport Fire Department. In 1974, General Electric moved their headquarters from the city's East Side to neighboring Fairfield, Connecticut. Other manufacturing companies that had been the symbol of the city also began to relocate out of Bridgeport.

In 1987, the L'Ambiance Plaza residential project, which was under construction at the time, collapsed, killing 28 construction workers. It was the worst disaster the city had faced at that point and one of the worst in Connecticut. Emergency crews from around New England responded to assist Bridgeport's Fire and Police Departments in the rescue and recovery effort.

In 1991, the city filed for bankruptcy protection but was declared solvent by a federal court.

Twenty-first century
Through the early 21st century, Bridgeport, a city that despite the longtime burdens of crime, poverty and corruption has taken steps toward redevelopment of its Downtown, as well as other neighborhoods. Although a plan for a large resort, casino, and high-rises fell through for the Steel Point area, the city still seeks redevelopment plans and projects. In 2004, artists' lofts in the former Read's Department Store on Broad Street first became available. Several other rental conversions have been completed, including the 117 unit Citytrust bank building on Main Street. The economic recession of 2008 has halted, at least temporarily, two major mixed-use projects including the proposed $1 billion waterfront development at Steel Point. However, other redevelopment projects have proceeded, albeit slowly, such as the condominium conversion project in Bijou Square. In 2009, the City Council approved a new master plan for development designed both to promote redevelopment in selected areas and to protect existing residential neighborhoods. In 2010, the Bridgeport Housing Authority and a local health center announced plans to build a $20 million medical and housing complex at Albion Street, making use of federal stimulus funds and designed to replace some of the housing lost with the demolition of Father Panik Village.

See also

National Register of Historic Places listings in Bridgeport, Connecticut
List of people from Bridgeport, Connecticut

Notes

References

External links
Bridgeport History Links
Bridgeport History in Postcards
Bridgeport Working: Voices from the 20th Century - Bridgeport Public Library
Bridgeport vaudeville theater history

 
Bridgeport, Connecticut